Seznam.cz (or Seznam, list in Czech) is a web portal and search engine in the Czech Republic. Founded in 1996 by Ivo Lukačovič in Prague as the first web portal in the Czech Republic. Seznam started with a search engine and an internet version of yellow pages. Today, Seznam runs almost 30 different web services and associated brands. Seznam had more than 6 million real users per month at the end of 2014. Among the most popular services, according to NetMonitor, are its homepage seznam.cz, email.cz, search.seznam.cz and its yellow pages firmy.cz.

In 2008, Seznam.cz was the most used search engine in the Czech Republic. As of May 2012, according to Toplist results, Seznam was the second internet search engine in the Czech Republic (42.84%) with Google in the top spot (54.69%).. By August 2014, still according to Toplist's statistics, Seznam's share of searches had further eroded to 38%.

Between 2011 and 2012, Seznam Czech rhyme; Seznam - najdu tam, co hledám (Seznam - I find there, what I search for) as its slogan. Its former (& current) slogan is Seznam - najdu tam, co neznám (Seznam - I find there, what I don't know).

History 
Founded by Ivo Lukačovič in 1996, Seznam began as the first internet yellow pages and search engine in the Czech Republic. Ivo started his business with 50,000 CZK he had saved up. In 1998, Seznam added email to its portfolio, with email accounts running on the @seznam.cz domain. Since then, more brands and services have come on-line. Since 2001, Seznam has included financial, social and political news, TV programs, weather forecasts, dictionaries, maps and community services.

In 2000, Spray International, a Swedish web portal company, invested in Seznam. At that time Seznam became a joint stock company. Until 2000, Ivo Lukačovič was self-employed and Seznam was his own sole business. With the investment, it is estimated that Spray International acquired around 30% share of Seznam. Exact numbers are not known, as Lukačovič and Seznam officials have never released any details about the transaction. What has been confirmed, though, is that Ivo Lukačovič retained at least 70% of Seznam stock after the investment.

Spray acquired a stake in Seznam with the intention of making an IPO; however, Spray never reached that goal. After the dot-com bubble burst in 2000, Spray abandoned the idea. There are rumors about Spray defaulting on its obligations to Ivo Lukačovič by not making an IPO. In 2003, Ivo Lukačovič increased the base capital of Seznam without Spray and became 70% owner of Seznam. Since 2003, Ivo Lukačovič has remained the controlling shareholder of Seznam.

Until 2003, Seznam had been using a fulltext engine from the Czech company Jyxo; however, in 2005, Seznam replaced that search engine with its own technology. Also in 2005, Seznam acquired the Czech firm ATC which was, among other ventures, running the email server Email.cz. Email services Email.cz and Seznam.cz have now merged.

In 2006, Seznam moved its headquarters from Prague Košíře to a more prominent location in the Prague Anděl. That year, Ivo Lukačovič gave up the day-to-day business direction of Seznam, and Pavel Zima became CEO. In the Fall of 2006, Seznam acquired all email users from another web portal, "Czech On Line", with the domain @post.cz.

Seznam bought 50% of Global Inspiration, a Czech company running a video portal Stream.cz, similar to the global YouTube in 2007. Lycos Europe (a subsequent incarnation of Spray International) sold its 30% share in Seznam to Tiger Holding and Miura International. Lycos received more than 1.7 billion CZK from this transaction. As of 2015, Miura International S.a.r.l. had 5,6% of shares, Tiger holding four S.a.r.l. had 24,4% of shares and Helifreak limited had 70% of shares.

In 2008, the Czech media reported on alleged meetings between Seznam and Goldman Sachs representatives to find a buyer for Seznam. Ivo Lukačovič and Seznam representatives denied this. Such speculation ended with the start of the financial crisis in Europe in late 2008.

The EU believes Google overtook Seznam.cz around 2011 in the Czech Republic. According to the data from ad marketing agency eVisions, Seznam still held a majority share of the Czech search market at the start of 2014, but that Google pulled ahead in the second half of that year. Google's share of search on the Czech internet at 74% as of the end of 2018, while Seznam's share at 26%.

Since 2016, Seznam.cz is operating its own internet news Seznam Zprávy. Since 2018, it is broadcasting its own television Televize Seznam.

Seznam services

Assessment
Seznam uses its own ranking scale for web pages, called S-Rank. It is a similar to PageRank with a range from 0 to 10.

References

External links

Google still struggling to conquer outposts
Ivo Lukačovič on the Czech Internet, media and politics 

Online companies of the Czech Republic
Czech websites
Internet search engines
Webmail
Internet properties established in 1996
Web portals
Television broadcasting companies of the Czech Republic

1996 establishments in the Czech Republic